is a Japanese actress, voice actress and singer. She is currently represented with Ken-On.

Biography
Ozaki was born in Tokyo. She was photographed to appear in brochures before the age of one.

Ozaki became a child actress in the third grade of elementary school both on the stage and in television On April 21, 2015, she transferred to Hibiki, together with Rimi Nishimoto.

Ozaki's first work as a voice actress was an announcement on the music video of "broadcasting department" at the "Milky Holmes Fall Sports Festival" held on 19 September 2015, and in 2016 she made her anime debut as the main character Ado Sukinanoka in the Luck & Logic corner anime Watashitachi, Luck-Logi-bu! Since then she has appeared in numerous stores including Luck & Logic related store events and beginner workshops.

Ozaka formed AyaYuka with voice actress Ayasa Itō, which is in charge of programmes on the Ibaraki Prefecture's official video site IbaKira TV.

In July 2016, she reached the semifinals of Kodansha's Miss iD She was later ranked third by Cheerz, and ranked tenth in Ar-Sha.com, and she will advance to the finals.

In 2017, Ozaki gained her first regular work in a thirty-minute anime as Serval, the leading role in the anime television series Kemono Friends.

On June 1, 2019, she transferred from Hibiki to Ken-On.

On May 14, 2021, it was announced Ozaki tested positive for COVID-19 but has shown no symptoms.

Personal life
She is nicknamed  by Sora Tokui.
Ozaki says that she is curious to express herself with one word.
She likes ice cream, but dislikes birds.
Ozaki's special skills is making sweets and being able to eat any spicy food, and her hobbies are watching films, photography, and mountain climbing.
Her favorite artists are CNBLUE and μ's (the fictional idol band from Love Live!.
Ozaki thinks that she would not lose to others, and likes staring and Tsutaya.

Filmography
Bold denotes main character.

Anime television

Video games

TV programmes

Internet TV

Radio
Bold denotes that the programme is still being broadcast. ※Internet webcasts.

Narration

Music CD

Other contents

References

Notes

Sources

External links
  
 
 

1993 births
Living people
Anime singers
Japanese child actresses
Japanese women pop singers
Japanese television personalities
Japanese video game actresses
Japanese voice actresses
Ken-On artists
Voice actresses from Tokyo